is a passenger railway station in the city of Ryūgasaki, Ibaraki Prefecture, Japan operated by the private railway operator Kantō Railway.

Lines
Ireji Station is a station on the Ryūgasaki Line, and is located 2.2 km from the official starting point of the line at Sanuki Station.

Station layout
The station consists of a single side platform, serving traffic in both directions. There is no station building, and the station is unattended.

Adjacent stations

History
Ireji Station was opened on 1 January 1901 as a station on the Ryūgasaki Railroad.  The line was merged with the Kanshima Sangu Railway in 1944, which in turn became the Kantō Railway in 1965.

Passenger statistics
In fiscal 2017, the station was used by an average of 66 passengers daily (boarding passengers only).

Surrounding area
Ireji Station is located in a rural area of the city Ryūgasaki, with few structures in the nearby vicinity.

See also
 List of railway stations in Japan

References

External links

 Kantō Railway Station Information 

Railway stations in Ibaraki Prefecture
Railway stations in Japan opened in 1901

Ryūgasaki, Ibaraki